The Indian state of Kerala borders with the states of Tamil Nadu on the south and east, Karnataka on the north and the Arabian Sea coastline on the west. The Western Ghats, bordering the eastern boundary of the State, form an almost continuous mountain wall, except near Palakkad where there is a natural mountain pass known as the Palakkad Gap.[1] When the independent India amalgamated small states together, Travancore and Cochin states were integrated to form Travancore-Cochin state on 1 July 1949. However, Malabar remained under the Madras province. The States Reorganisation Act of 1 November 1956 elevated Kerala to statehood.

Administrative structure
On the basis of geographical, historical and cultural similarities, the districts are generally grouped into North Kerala, Central Kerala and South Kerala.

Divisions

North Kerala
Kasaragod
Kannur
Wayanad
Kozhikode
Malappuram

Central Kerala
Palakkad
Thrissur
Ernakulam

South Kerala
Idukki
Kottayam
Alappuzha
Pathanamthitta
Kollam
Thiruvananthapuram

References
Website of the Government of Kerala

Geography of Kerala